Gurjinder Kumar (born 10 October 1990), is an Indian professional footballer who plays as a defender for NorthEast United in the Indian Super League.

Club career

Early career
Born in Nawanshahr, Punjab, Gurjinder was born into a family of footballers. At the age of 10, after his older brother died, he started to take football seriously and joined the Chandigarh Football Academy. After spending seven years there Kumar moved to the famed Tata Football Academy where he joined the academy senior side.

Pune
In 2010, Gurjinder signed his first professional contract with Pune of the I-League. He scored his first professional goal during his first season at the club on 26 February 2011 against Viva Kerala in which his 11th-minute goal put Pune into an early 2–0 lead. The club eventually managed to get into a 4–0 lead but then gave up four goals to draw the match 4–4. After the 2010–11 season, he was named the Pune's best under-23 player at the club's annual awards ceremony. Gurjinder was part of the team that played against the then Premier League side Blackburn Rovers on 7 October 2011, in a game that Blackburn won 3-0 He then scored his second career goal the next season against Viva Kerala again, in a match Pune managed to win 3–1. Kumar then went on to score his third goal of his career, and his second that season, only a month later on 21 December 2011 against Churchill Brothers in which his 84th-minute strike helped Pune finish the match 2–0 winners. His fourth goal of his career, and last for the season, came on 18 January 2012 against Mumbai in which he found the net in the 90th minute to finish a 3–0 victory for Pune. Then after the 2011–12 season, he was given the "Goal of the Year" award for his strike against Chirag United Kerala. He won the Ashok Piramal Group "Young Player of the Year" award for 2012–13 season.

Gurjinder did not score again until the 2013–14 season when his goal against Rangdajied United on 11 December 2013 to give Pune a 2–0 lead which they would eventually give up and lose 3–2.

Salgaocar
Gurjinder Kumar signed for Salgaocar for the 2014-15 I-League and made his debut in the 2014-15 Indian Federation Cup, scoring 3 times in the group stages.

FC Pune City
In July 2015 Kumar was drafted to play for FC Pune City in the 2015 Indian Super League.

NorthEast United
In 2020 Kumar was signed by NorthEast United on a 2 years deal.

International
In June 2011 Kumar made his international debut for India at the under-23 level against Qatar U23 side for the 2012 Olympic qualifiers. Then on 1 February 2012 Kumar was called up to the senior India side for a preparation camp for the upcoming 2012 AFC Challenge Cup. He then made his senior international debut for India on 27 February 2012 against Azerbaijan in a friendly in which he started and played the full 90 minutes as India lost 0–3.

Career statistics

Club

International stats

Honours

Individual
 Pune's Best U-23 Player of the Year: 2010–11
 Pune F.C. Goal of the Year: 2011–12
 Ashok Piramal Group Young Player of the Year: 2012–13

Club
Mohun Bagan
Calcutta Football League (1): 2018–19

References

External links
 Pune Football Club Profile.
 I-League Profile.

1990 births
Living people
People from Punjab, India
Indian footballers
Pune FC players
Salgaocar FC players
FC Pune City players
Association football defenders
Footballers from Punjab, India
I-League players
India international footballers
India youth international footballers
RoundGlass Punjab FC players
Mohun Bagan AC players
NorthEast United FC players
Indian Super League players